Daniel Sanders may refer to:

 Daniel Sanders (lexicographer) (1819–1897), German lexicographer of Jewish parentage
 Daniel Sanders (American football) (born 1986), American football center
 Daniel P. Sanders, graph theorist